Avalanche Peak is a  peak in the Arthur's Pass National Park in New Zealand. It is subject to avalanches in the winter, hence its name.

It is the most popular day walking peak from Arthur's Pass, as it is easily accessible from the village and offers views of several mountain ranges in the park on a clear day.  It is also a popular place for kea.

There is an annual mountain run, the Avalanche Peak Challenge which crosses the peak.

References

Mountains of Canterbury, New Zealand
Arthur's Pass National Park